Thymidylate kinase (dTMP kinase) catalyzes the phosphorylation of thymidine 5'-monophosphate (dTMP) to form thymidine 5'-diphosphate (dTDP) in the presence of ATP and magnesium:

 ATP + thymidine 5'-phosphate  ADP + thymidine 5'-diphosphate

Thymidylate kinase is a ubiquitous enzyme of about 25 Kd and is important in the dTTP synthesis pathway for DNA synthesis. The function of dTMP kinase in eukaryotes comes from the study of a cell cycle mutant, cdc8, in Saccharomyces cerevisiae. Structural and functional analyses suggest that the cDNA codes for authentic human dTMP kinase. The mRNA levels and enzyme activities corresponded to cell cycle progression and cell growth stages.

Thymidylate kinase's subfamily is predicted thymidylate kinase, TKRP1. 

Human protein DTYMK contains this domain.

Structural studies

See also
Thymidine kinase
Thymidylate synthase
Thymidine kinase in clinical chemistry

References

 
 
 

Protein families
EC 2.7.4
Enzymes of known structure